John Robert Silber (August 15, 1926 – September 27, 2012) was an American academician and candidate for public office. From 1971 to 1996, he was President of Boston University (BU) and, from 1996 to 2002, Chancellor. From 2002 to 2003, he again served as President (Ad Interim); and, from 2003 until his death, he held the title of President Emeritus.

In 1990, he won the Democratic gubernatorial primary to become one of two major-party candidates for governor of Massachusetts in the general election of 1990. He lost that election to the Republican William Weld, who won by 38,000 votes.

After receiving his PhD from Yale, Silber became professor of philosophy and served as dean of the University of Texas's College of Arts and Sciences (1967–70). He had a liberal reputation in his days at Texas, though at Boston University he was best known as a conservative spokesman in academia.

Family and education
Silber was born in San Antonio, Texas, the second son of Paul George Silber, an immigrant architect from Germany, and Jewell (née Joslin) Silber, a Texas-born elementary school teacher. He was born with a malformed right arm that ended in a stump just below his elbow with a rudimentary thumb. Unashamed of the deformity, he had his suits tailored to expose the arm.

Both of his parents were Presbyterians. As an adult, he learned that his father's side of the family was Jewish and that his aunt had been killed at Auschwitz. His father had never said anything about it.

Silber was a member of the National Honor Society at Jefferson High School in San Antonio, and played trumpet in the school band. He graduated from Jefferson in 1943. At Trinity University in San Antonio, he double-majored in fine arts and philosophy.

In the fall of 1943, as a freshman at Trinity, he met a sophomore named Kathryn Underwood, daughter of farmers from Normanna, Texas. The couple were engaged in January 1946 and married on July 12, 1947. Silber graduated summa cum laude from Trinity in June 1947. Silber and his wife had eight children, one son and six daughters by birth and one son by adoption. Their first-born son and daughter were born before 1955. Five more daughters were born over the next eleven years. Their first-born son, David Silber, died of AIDS at age 41 at their home in December 1994. Silber's wife Kathryn died in 2005.

Early academic career
Silber received his M.A. in 1952 and worked first as a teaching assistant and then as an instructor while pursuing a doctoral degree. Peter H. Hare, Professor Emeritus of Philosophy at SUNY-Buffalo, remembers Silber as a teaching assistant at Yale in the mid-1950s while Hare was still an undergraduate. Hare wrote, "George Schrader was the lecturer in the introductory course where John Silber was the TA leading my discussion section. Silber, a rabid Kantian, was the person with whom I had my first heated philosophical arguments as an adult."

In 1959, Silber earned a Fulbright scholarship, which enabled him to travel to West Germany to teach at the University of Bonn for a year. It was there that he learned of his father's Jewish heritage.

His first full-time faculty job was at the University of Texas at Austin, where he chaired the Philosophy department from 1962 to 1967. Larry Hickman, Director of the Center for Dewey Studies at Southern Illinois University in Carbondale, recalls his time as a student in philosophy at UT. "The department chairs during those years, John Silber and Irwin C. Lieb, were busy using Texas oil money to collect the very best faculty and graduate students they could find."

While at UT, Silber was well known for his support of liberal causes, having founded the Texas society to abolish capital punishment and being a supporter of civil rights.

In 1967, Silber became Dean of the College of Arts and Sciences at UT. Three years later, in a widely publicized firing, Silber was removed as Dean in 1970 by the UT Regents Chairman Frank Craig Erwin, Jr.

Boston University
Silber was named president of Boston University (BU) on December 17, 1970. He took office the following month. With an annual salary that reached $800,000, Silber ranked as one of the highest paid college presidents in the country. He took a one-year leave of absence from BU in 1987, and then again in 1990 when he ran for governor of Massachusetts as a Democrat. He returned to his position at BU after losing the election to William Weld. In 1996, he was named university chancellor after stepping down as president. That same year he was appointed by Gov. Weld to serve as head of the Massachusetts Board of Education.

Among Silber's recruits to the Boston University faculty were the author Saul Bellow and Elie Wiesel, writer and concentration camp survivor.

Tension with faculty and students
Under Silber, Boston University increased in size but questions about his leadership style caused splits among faculty and alumni. In his early days as BU President, Silber accused the faculty of mediocrity and the students of fostering anarchy, and they, in turn, accused him of tyrannical rule. The faculty organized a union in 1974 and the following year voted to affiliate with the American Association of University Professors (AAUP). Fritz Ringer, a BU faculty member, served as president of the BU chapter of the AAUP for eight years.

According to Perspectives Online, the publication of the American Historical Association, "at a time when the BU president (Silber) was running roughshod over faculty rights, Fritz Ringer bravely and vigorously championed the principles of academic freedom."

Initially the Silber administration would not negotiate with the union. In 1976 the refusal was challenged in a lawsuit. Two-thirds of the faculty and deans demanded the board of trustees fire Silber. The board refused. In 1978 the courts decided in favor of the AAUP position and Boston University was forced to negotiate. The faculty conducted a strike in 1979, which was followed by a clerical workers' walkout in which several faculty members refused to cross the picket line. Silber charged five of these faculty members with negligence and moved to have them disciplined. At that point faculty members throughout Boston signed a petition to have Silber removed.

Silber was especially visible for confrontations with historian Howard Zinn. In one incident, Zinn arranged to take a sabbatical and teach in Paris, with Herbert Marcuse teaching at BU in the meantime. Silber vetoed the move. Silber also prevented Zinn from receiving pay raises and promotions over a number of years. In 1982, the AAUP intervened on Zinn's behalf, eventually forcing Silber to compensate Zinn for back pay.  In addition, Jason Pramas wrote about Silber suppressing an anti-apartheid protest in 1986.

In 1987, the courts ruled that faculty in the local AAUP chapter were "managerial" employees, and therefore could not engage in collective bargaining.

Endowment investment controversy
During his tenure as president, $85 million, nearly one fifth of the Boston University endowment, was invested in a biotechnology company named Seragen. Investments continued, even after a rebuke from state regulators because of the risk involved. The bulk of the investment was lost when the Seragen stock collapsed.

Gay rights issues
In 2002, Silber ordered that the Boston University Academy, a prep school operated by BU, disband its gay–straight alliance, a student club that staged demonstrations to publicize the deleterious effects of homophobia. Silber dismissed the stated purpose of the club—to serve as a support group for gay students and to promote tolerance and understanding between gay and straight students—accusing the club of being a vehicle for "homosexual recruitment." Silber denounced the group for "evangelism" and "homosexual militancy" with the purpose of promoting gay sex.

Silber's deferred compensation
On May 10, 2006, The New York Times reported that the trustees of Boston University had given Silber an unprecedented compensation package, including deferred compensation, worth $6.1 million in 2005.

Political activities
Silber advocated integration at the University of Texas and was the first person to chair the Texas Society to Abolish Capital Punishment. He also promoted Operation Head Start, an early education program for preschoolers.

In the Massachusetts gubernatorial election of 1990, Silber ran for Governor of Massachusetts as a Democrat. His outsider status, as well as his outspoken and combative style, were at first seen as advantages in a year in which voters were disenchanted with the Democratic Party establishment. As the Democratic nominee, Silber faced Republican William Weld.

Silber's perceived angry personality, coupled with Weld's socially liberal views, helped Weld in the race. During the gubernatorial race, Silber regularly overreacted to questions from the press. These overreactions came to be known as "Silber shockers." On the campaign trail, he called Massachusetts a "welfare magnet" and proposed cutting off benefits for unmarried mothers who have a second child while still on public aid. He questioned saving the lives of terminally ill elderly people, quoting Shakespeare and saying that "when you've had a long life and you're ripe, then it's time to go."

He said that the feminist Gloria Steinem, the black Nation of Islam leader Louis Farrakhan, and white supremacists are "the kind of people I wouldn't appoint as judges." In a key interview late in the campaign, Silber was asked by WCVB-TV newscaster Natalie Jacobson to name a weakness; he testily replied, "you find a weakness, I don't have to go around telling you what's wrong with me." After this performance, Silber's poll numbers declined rapidly. Ultimately, Weld was able to hold on to a significant portion of the Republican base while appealing to large numbers of Democrats and left-of-center independents, enabling him to defeat Silber by four points. Weld became the first Republican to serve as governor since early 1975.

Publications
Silber wrote four books. Straight Shooting: What's Wrong with America and How to Fix It (Harper & Row, 1989), Architecture of the Absurd: How "Genius" Disfigured a Practical Art (Quantuck Lane, 2007), Kant's Ethics: The Good, Freedom, and the Will (DeGruyter, 2012) and Seeking the North Star (David R. Godine, Publisher, 2013).

Straight Shooting is part autobiography and partly a statement of Silber's concern that the United States has experienced a decline in moral and spiritual values traceable to excessive avarice and materialism. He also faults society with excessive reliance on litigation to settle disputes.

Architecture of the Absurd discusses Silber's view that certain celebrity architects frequently fail to meet the needs of their clients because they consider themselves primarily sculptors and do not adequately consider financial constraints, the physical needs of building occupants or the urban environment. He is critical of architects Josep Lluís Sert, Le Corbusier, Frank Gehry, Daniel Libeskind and Steven Holl.

In 1976, BU published a 32-page article by Silber called "Democracy: Its Counterfeits and Its Promise". Other of his articles have been published in Philosophical Quarterly, Philosophical Review and Kant-Studien where he served as editor.

Legacy
On May 14, 2008, Sherborn Street, which bisects the main BU Campus from Commonwealth Avenue to Back Street, was officially renamed by the City of Boston. Mayor Thomas Menino said that it was fitting to rename the street John R. Silber Way. "Was there any other way?" Menino quipped, referring to Silber's four decades of influence on the BU campus.

Death
Boston University announced Silber's death on September 27, 2012. He was 86. At a memorial service on November 29, 2012, writer Tom Wolfe spoke to the 750 people who gathered, saying that Silber was a man who "couldn't bring himself to flatter."

References

Further reading
 Aeschliman, Michael D., (13 October 2012). "Dr. Valiant-For-Truth", National Review
 Aeschliman, Michael D., (16 April 2014). "A Texan to the Rescue", National Review
 Allis, Sam, (August 28, 1989). "The Ivory Tower Triggerman", Time,69
 Kimball, Roger. "John Silber, 1926–2012", New Criterion (November 2012) Vol. 31, No. 3 online

External links
 Boston University's biography of Silber
  and 
 Village Voice article accusing Silber of bigotry and homophobia
 
 New York Review of Books sequence of letters:
 Letter from professors at Boston University accusing Silber of violating academic freedom
 Response to the letter by the Boston University professors from a Silber supporter
 Rebuttal by the Boston University professors to the response by the Silber supporter
 
 

1926 births
2012 deaths
American people of German-Jewish descent
American people with disabilities
Jefferson High School (San Antonio, Texas) alumni
Massachusetts Democrats
Writers from San Antonio
Presidents of Boston University
Trinity University (Texas) alumni
University of Texas at Austin alumni
University of Texas at Austin faculty
Yale Divinity School alumni
American academicians